Trial Harbour is a rural locality in the local government area (LGA) of West Coast in the North-west and west LGA region of Tasmania. The 2016 census has a population of 24 for the state suburb of Trial Harbour.

It is a small anchorage on the West Coast, Tasmania and historical locality, located in the northern part of Ocean Beach, Tasmania.  It was an exposed and particularly vulnerable anchorage which was susceptible to the  prevailing local weather of the Roaring Forties, seventeen miles north of Macquarie Heads (the entrance to Macquarie Harbour).

History 
The locality was named Remine until 1987, when it was renamed. Trial Harbour was gazetted as a locality in 1987.

Indigenous usage 
Carvings and middens were identified in the 1930s and 1990s.

European usage 
It was named after the cutter Trial, which first anchored there in 1881, and it was established by four Baltic sailors, Gustav Weber, and the three Karlson brothers, Karl, Peter and Steve, otherwise known as the Russian Finns.

The harbour was utilised for a short while during the establishment of the early mining communities of Zeehan, and Queenstown, prior to the establishment of the settlements and facilities at Strahan and Regatta Point.  It came under the control of the Hobart Marine Board.

It had two hotels and other facilities in its early days and currently it is the location of holiday homes.

It has been also a location on the west coast where whales have been sighted close to shore.

Further north along the coast – a similarly dangerous and exposed location was Granville Harbour.

Geography
The waters of the Southern Ocean form the western boundary, and the Little Henty River forms most of the southern.

Road infrastructure 
Route C248 (Trial Harbour Road) enters from east and runs through to the west, where it ends.

Notes

References
 

History of Tasmania
Coastline of Tasmania
Localities of West Coast Council
Towns in Tasmania